Areh may refer to:
Valentin Areh (b. 1971), Slovenian journalist
Areh, Iran, a village in Kerman Province, Iran
Areh, Syria, a village in as-Suwayda Governorate, Syria